is a local hero from Nikaho, Akita Prefecture, a fictional superhero who represents the region and is depicted as a tokusatsu hero. Developed by a local sports gym's manager and former UWF professional wrestler , Chōjin Neiger debuted in June 2005 and has gained a following throughout all of Japan. Chōjin Neiger has also spawned radio dramas, comic books, and television specials, and a series of original songs which include the vocal talents of Ichirou Mizuki and Mitsuko Horie.

The Chōjins
Each of the characters developed by the Neiger Project is said to protect a different aspect of Akita Prefecture.
Neiger can also assume a power-up form, .
He also gets a powered up form called .
His name comes from the Akita dialect word , meaning "shiny", referencing the Maziora coloration of his costume.
 Zapper Zeal is Neiger's apprentice who is armed with a leek sword. He is named after the Akita Prefecture dish .

CD releases
Neiger Theme Song  c/w  by Ichirou Mizuki
Ōga Neiger Theme Song  c/w  by Ichirou Mizuki

 by Abe 10zen
 by Shiro Fujisato
 by Mitsuko Horie
 by Ryu Hachimori
 by Kakusai Han
 by Abe 10zen

See also
Local hero (Japan)
Ryūjin Mabuyer

References

External links
Official website
Neiger Project at NHK
Neiger Comic at Kadokawa Shoten

Akita Prefecture
Tokusatsu